Westgate Ward is a ward in the central Area of Ipswich, Suffolk, England. It returns three councillors to Ipswich Borough Council.

It is designated Middle Layer Super Output Area Ipswich 006 by the Office of National Statistics. It is composed of 5 Lower Layer Super Output Areas.

Ward profile, 2008
Westgate Ward is located to the north western of Ipswich town centre. In 2005 it had a population of a little over 8,400. At that time a relatively high proportion of the residents were adults living alone

References

Wards of Ipswich